Juanda International Airport (JIA) , is an international airport located in Sedati, Sidoarjo. It is now the third busiest airport in Indonesia (after Soekarno-Hatta and Ngurah Rai airport). Juanda International Airport is operated by PT Angkasa Pura I. The airport takes its name after Djuanda Kartawidjaja (1911–1963), the last Prime Minister of Indonesia who had suggested development of this airport. In 2019, the airport served about 500 aircraft per day.

Currently, Juanda International Airport is the hub of Citilink, Garuda Indonesia, Indonesia AirAsia, Lion Air and Sriwijaya Air along with Soekarno–Hatta International Airport. Juanda International Airport will become one of the main airports in Indonesia for ASEAN Open skies.

In 2014, Juanda International Airport becomes the world's tenth best in Airport Service Quality by Airport Council International among 79 airports with passengers capacity between 5-15 million a year. In Q1 2015, the airport becomes the world's seventh best in Airport Service Quality by ACI.

History
Being opened on 7 February 1964 as a naval air base of Indonesia, it replaced the previous airport in Morokrembangan, near Surabaya harbor. It was originally used as home base for Indonesian Navy's fleet of Ilyushin Il-28 and Fairey Gannet. In its development it was also used for civil aviation. And PT Angkasa Pura I handled the management and operation since January 1985. On 24 December 1990 Juanda Airport was gained international airport status after the opening of the international terminal. Previously, since December 1987, the airport has served flights to Singapore, Kuala Lumpur, Hong Kong, Taipei and Manila.

KLM served Surabaya from April 1996 to March 1997. The carrier offered flights to Amsterdam via Singapore on Boeing 747s.

Development of airport city
On 25 February 2015, Indonesia President Joko Widodo agreed to develop Juanda Airport City, including an additional two runways and an integrated connection between Gubeng railway station and the airport via an elevated railway. About  of land have been prepared for the expansion of the airport - where in  will be used to construct two additional runways, and Juanda Airport's Terminal 3, while the remaining area will be used to construct the Airport City and the Ultimate Terminal Building.

The new area for Juanda Airport is estimated to be  and will be located in the northern part of the airport. Construction of two runways by will require the reclamation of about  stretch of land along Java's northern coastline. The land acquisition is expected to be completed by 2018. Development consists of three phases;
First phase is the confirmation of the masterplan, land acquisition, reclamation for runway 2 and construction of runway 2.
Second phase is the development of Terminal 1, reclamation for runway 3, construction of runway 3 and accessibility from toll roads and terminal.
Third phase will be building an Ultimate Terminal and airport city supporting infrastructure.

Terminals and runway
At present, Juanda International Airport has 2 terminals.
A new three-story terminal building was opened in October 2006, which is now Terminal 1. The building has a capacity of eight million passengers per year and features a  domestic passenger terminal, a  international terminal and 11 aerobridges. The terminal used a mix of high hat roofs from Rumah adat Sumba as well as Java-Malay architecture themes. Terminal 1 is used for all domestic flights, except Garuda Indonesia and Indonesia AirAsia flights.

Terminal 2 was built by demolishing the old terminal building, which was opened on 14 February 2014. The architecture of T2 is modern with curved features when compared to Terminal 1. Terminal 2 is used for all international flights, Garuda Indonesia and Indonesia AirAsia domestic and international flights. In addition, Terminal 2 features the Garuda Indonesia Executive Lounge for domestic flights and the Concordia Premier Lounge for international flights.

The airport has separate  administration building, including a 15-story control tower, and a two-story cargo building with domestic and international cargo sections, capable of handling  of cargo a year. The apron with an area of  can handle 18 aircraft simultaneously, including two wide body, 11 medium and five small aircraft. There are two  parallel taxiways, including five exit taxiways ( wide) and four connecting taxiways (also ). The airport has a parking area of  parking area that can accommodate more than 3,000 vehicles.

Airlines and destinations

Statistics
In 2010, the airport handled 11 million passengers, although the capacity was 6 million passengers and the Air Traffic Controller radar system is only able to track 21 aircraft per hour, but at peak hour handled 40 to 45 aircraft landing and taking off.
The following are statistics for the airport from 1999 to 2013. In addition to this, it is noted that, in 2006, the domestic sector between Surabaya and Jakarta is the fourth-busiest air route in Asia with over 750 weekly flights.

Source : PT (persero) ANGKASA PURA 1

Ground transport
DAMRI buses are provided by the local government to deliver passengers to Surabaya. Fixed tariff taxis are available to various destinations in Surabaya and surrounding areas including Malang, Blitar, Jember, and Tulungagung. Taxi tickets can be purchased at the counter located at the airport exit.

Accidents and incidents
 On 21 February 2007, Adam Air Flight 172 flying from Jakarta to Surabaya with registration PK-KKV (c/n 27284) had a hard landing at this airport, resulting in structural failure of the aircraft.
 On 13 April 2010, Cathay Pacific Flight 780 from Juanda International Airport to Hong Kong International Airport landed safely after both engines failed due to contaminated fuel uploaded at the airport. 57 passengers were injured. The two pilots later received the Polaris Award from the International Federation of Air Line Pilots' Associations for their heroism and airmanship.
 On 1 February 2014, Lion Air Flight 361, a Boeing 737-900ER (registration PK-LFH) from Balikpapan Sultan Aji Muhammad Sulaiman Airport to Juanda International Airport landed hard and bounced four times on the runway, causing a tail strike and substantial damage to the plane. There were no fatalities, but two passengers were seriously injured and three others had minor injuries.
On 28 December 2014, Indonesia AirAsia Flight 8501, an Airbus A320-216 registered PK-AXC (MSN 3648) with 155 passengers and 7 crew on board, crashed into the Java Sea whilst en route from Juanda International Airport to Changi International Airport, Singapore, killing all 162 on board. Regulatory licenses for the Surabaya-Singapore route as well as Medan-Palembang route have been suspended for Indonesia AirAsia since January 2015 due to suspected licensing breaches; the Medan-Palembang route had been resumed, however.

Gallery

Notes

References

External links

 PT. Angkasa Pura I: Juanda Airport 
 Transport Malang To Surabaya
 Juanda International Airport website
 

Surabaya
Transport in East Java
Airports in East Java
Airports established in 1964
1964 establishments in Indonesia
Military installations of Indonesia